Roy William Gleason (born April 9, 1943) is an American former professional baseball player who appeared in eight games in Major League Baseball for the Los Angeles Dodgers late in the  season. An outfielder by trade, he was a switch hitter who threw left-handed.

Gleason was born in Melrose Park, Illinois, but grew up in Garden Grove, California, in Orange County. 

He signed with the Los Angeles Dodgers in June 1961. In 1963, after spending the minor-league campaign with Class A Salem of the Northwest League, he was recalled by the Dodgers in September when rosters expanded to 40 players. In his eight games, Gleason was used primarily as a pinch runner, although he had one official at bat on September 28, 1963. In the eighth inning of a game against the Philadelphia Phillies at Dodger Stadium, pinch hitting for pitcher Phil Ortega, Gleason, batting right-handed, hit a double down the left-field line against left-hander Dennis Bennett and eventually scored a run. The Dodgers won the 1963 World Series, earning him a World Series ring, but that ring was eventually lost during his time in Vietnam.

In 1967, he was drafted into the United States Army and later served in the Vietnam War with the 9th Infantry Division (Old Reliables) and earned a Purple Heart when he was wounded by enemy forces while on patrol. He achieved the rank of sergeant and was also entitled to wear the Combat Infantryman Badge.

After his return from Vietnam, he again played in the Dodgers' farm system in 1969 and 1970, although his war injuries had impaired his baseball skills, so he never made it back to the major leagues. 

He became a car salesman, married twice, and had two sons.

Roy Gleason remains the only US combat veteran and former Major League Baseball player to receive "Special Congressional Recognition" for being awarded a Purple Heart, a World Series Ring, and holding a "perfect" lifetime Major League batting average.  He also remains the only professional baseball player who, after first playing in the major leagues, was drafted into the US Army and sent to the front lines in the Vietnam War.

TV and movie career
Gleason appeared in the TV series Branded, alongside Chuck Connors, and as "Gotham 100" race car driver Grimaldi Smith in the Batman episode "Come Back, Shame" [S2, E25, series episode 59].

Gleason was considered for the lead role in the film Doubles Brigade.

References

External links

1943 births
Living people
Albuquerque Dodgers players
Albuquerque Dukes players
Arizona Instructional League Dodgers players
Bakersfield Dodgers players
Baseball players from Illinois
Charros de Jalisco players
Los Angeles Dodgers players
People from Melrose Park, Illinois
Reno Silver Sox players
Salem Dodgers players
Santa Barbara Dodgers players
Tri-City Atoms players
United States Army personnel of the Vietnam War
United States Army soldiers